The West Peruvian screech owl or Peruvian screech owl (Megascops roboratus) is a species of owl in the family Strigidae. It is found in Ecuador and Peru.

Taxonomy and systematics

The West Peruvian screech owl has sometimes been treated as conspecific with the tropical screech owl (M. choliba) though their vocalizations are distinct. Two subspecies are recognized, the nominate M. r. roboratus and M. r. pacificus. The latter has been suggested as a species in its own right.

Description

It has both gray and rufous morphs. The former has a grayish facial disc with a black border, white brows above pale to golden yellow eyes, and small "ear" tufts. The crown is blackish brown and the upperparts gray brown with slight darker bars. It has a pale nuchal collar. Its underparts are whitish with faint vermiculation. The rufous morph is pale rufous all over with dark brown markings. 

Its gray morph is typically grayer than the nominate but there is much overlap. Its rufous morph is more common than that of the nominate.

Distribution and habitat

The pacificus subspecies of West Peruvian screech owl is found from Santa Elena and Guayas Provinces in southwestern Ecuador south slightly into northwestern Peru as far as Lambayeque Province. The nominate M. r. roboratus is found inland, in the drainages of the Río Chinchipe and Río Marañón between the western and central Andes.

M. r. roboratus inhabits dry deciduous woodland, on mountain slopes and hills.

Behavior

Feeding

As far as is known, the West Peruvian screech owl is strictly nocturnal. Its diet is mostly, and possibly exclusively, insects.

Breeding

Both subspecies have been documented to nest in tree cavities, and the nominate has also possibly used old nests of the Pale-legged Hornero (Furnarius leucopus). Little else is known.

Vocalization

The nominate West Peruvian screech owl's song is "a trill of equally spaced notes  increasing in volume toward the end". That of M. r. pacificus is "a similar trill  that rises in volume and drops slightly in pitch at toward the end".

Status

The IUCN has assessed the West Peruvian screech owl as being of Least Concern. However, it is "overall rare and possibly vulnerable" and "much habitat [has been] rendered unsuitable" by grazing and woodcutting.

References

Megascops
Birds described in 1918
Taxonomy articles created by Polbot